The MCV Evora (stylised as eVoRa; internal designation: MCV C123) is a single-decker bus bodywork produced by Manufacturing Commercial Vehicles (MCV) since 2018, as the successor to the MCV Evolution. The Evora is currently available on Volvo B8RLE and Volvo B5LH chassis.

In terms of styling, the Evora shares many features with the MCV EvoSeti double-decker bus, particularly the styling of the front and rear panels. The 12.2-metre model on Volvo B8RLE chassis has a capacity for up to 46 seats and 95 passengers including standing passengers. The Evora is also available on the shorter, 10.8-metre B8RLE chassis.

Operators

Uno were the first customer for the Evora, ordering six for their Hertfordshire routes, including the 610, in early 2018. Uno later took delivery of two more Evoras in August 2021. JJ Kavanagh and Sons became the first operator of the Evora in Ireland, taking delivery of three examples in early 2018.

The MCV Evora is popular with independently-run bus companies. Significant operators include Sanders Coaches in Norfolk, who took delivery of 10 Evoras, six of these 10.8m examples, between 2021 and 2023, while in Lanarkshire, 20 Evoras were delivered to Whitelaws of Stonehouse throughout 2021 and 2022, and nine Evoras were delivered to JMB Travel of Wishaw in May 2022. 

Lothian Buses are currently the largest operator of Volvo B8RLE MCV Evoras, introducing a fleet of 30 12.9m MCV Evoras on Volvo B8RLE chassis into service in January 2021, intended for service on route 30.

The Stagecoach Group has been a recent customer of the Evora. Stagecoach South Wales were the first subdivision to purchase Evoras, taking eight for the TrawsCymru network in 2019, while Stagecoach East have bought six for services on the Cambridgeshire Guided Busway. Stagecoach Highlands first received 25 Evoras for service contracts on the Orkney Islands in October 2021, with five of these being short 10.8m examples, and later took delivery of eleven Evoras, two of these being 10.8m examples, for use on the Isle of Skye in November 2022. Elsewhere in the Scottish Highlands, The Highland Council took delivery of six Evoras in December 2022, which are to be used on council-operated public and school bus services in the region from January 2023.

Arriva UK Bus ordered their first Evoras in 2021, with Arriva Midlands taking on 14 10.8m examples on Volvo B8RLE chassis in November for the Luton to Dunstable Busway. 12 Evoras were delivered to Arriva Buses Wales in February 2023 for services in Bangor.

These buses were marketed as Volvo 7900 Hybrid buses and were rolled out into service in the second half of 2018.

See also
Wright Eclipse 3, the Evora's main competitor for bodywork on Volvo B8RLE chassis
MCV Evolution 2, the Evora's predecessor, which remains in production on shorter, more lightweight bus chassis
MCV EvoSeti, the double-decker version of the Evora

References

External links

Low-floor buses
Low-entry buses
Full-size buses
Vehicles introduced in 2018